The Key to the City is an honor bestowed by a city upon esteemed residents and visitors.

Key to the City, or Keys to the City, may also refer to:

 Key to the City (film), a 1950 film starring Clark Gable and Loretta Young
 Keys to the City (Mulgrew Miller album), 1985
 Keys to the City (Ramsey Lewis album), 1987
 "Keys to the City" (song), 2008, credited to Ministry and Co-Conspirators